His Majesty, Bunker Bean may refer to:
 His Majesty, Bunker Bean (1918 film), an American silent comedy film
 His Majesty, Bunker Bean (1925 film), an American silent comedy film